"" is the national anthem of the Central African Republic. It was adopted on 25 May 1960, shortly before the republic's independence on 13 August the same year. The words were written by then Prime Minister Barthélémy Boganda. The music was composed by French composer Herbert Pepper, who also composed the national anthem of Senegal, "". The song was also the national anthem during the Central African Empire (1976–1979).

Lyrics 
The anthem has official lyrics in both French and the national language of Sango.

Notes

References

External links
 Central African Republic: "La Renaissance" - Audio of the national anthem of the Central African Republic, with information and lyrics

National anthems
Central African Republic music
National symbols of the Central African Republic
African anthems
Year of song missing
National anthem compositions in D major
National anthem compositions in E major